Guns Don't Argue  is a 1957 low-budget feature film about the early achievements of the FBI in defeating the most notorious criminals of the 1930s. The film involves dramatizations of the crimes and eventual demise of various gangsters, along with a moralistic narrative. It was edited together from a composite of three episodes from the 1952 TV series Gangbusters.

Production
The film was released to theatres in 1957 as a feature produced by William Faris, directed by Bill Karn & Richard Kahn.

A similar film, Gang Busters (1954), was also originally based on the dramatic radio program first titled G-Men, which premiered on July 20, 1935. The title was changed to Gang Busters on January 15, 1936.

Plot
The film takes the form of a docudrama in which actors who are cast as FBI Special Agents speak to camera about the war on gangsters in the mid-1920s through the late-1930s. Using contacts with gun molls, agents track down criminals. The film dramatizes the crime careers, and final capture or deaths of John Dillinger, the Barker Gang (Ma Barker, Fred Barker, Arthur Barker, Alvin Karpis), Bonnie and Clyde, Homer Van Meter, Doc Barker and Pretty-Boy Floyd. The "docudrama" does not portray events, many situations, or the FBI Special Agents accurately. For instance, the name of the FBI Special Agent who was killed in the Kansas City Massacre on June 17, 1933 was Raymond J. Caffrey, and it was not his first day with the FBI. Names of all FBI Special Agents who have been killed in the line of duty may be found on the FBI Hall of Honor.

Portrayal of events
The film is a revisionist docudrama, portraying the war on gangsters in the mid-1920s through the late-1930s from a pro-FBI point of view. Most notable is the portrayal of the deaths of Bonnie and Clyde and John Dillinger. The scenes show each firing off the first shot, and having ample time to "give themselves up", when in fact they were gunned down in an ambush by the police and Federal agents.

The movie is greatly admired by Martin Scorsese, who has said, "It's an amazing film. It's to be studied, because it shows you how to make a film on a low budget".

Cast
 Jim Davis as Texas Ranger Captain Stewart/Narrator
 Lyle Talbot as Dr. William Guellfe, plastic surgeon
 Lash LaRue as 'Doc' Barker
 Richard Crane as Homer Van Meter
 Myron Healey as John Dillinger
 Ann Morriss as Mildred Jaunce, The Lady in Red
 Sam Edwards as Fred Barker
 Paul Dubov as Alvin Karpis
 Baynes Barron as Clyde Barrow
 Tamar Cooper as Bonnie Parker
 Regina Gleason as Hope
 Knobby Schaeffer as Adam Richetti
 Jeanne Carmen as Paula
 Aline Towne as Shirley, girl with Karpis
 Doug Wilson as 'Pretty Boy' Floyd
 Robert Kendall as Baby Face Nelson
 Jean Harvey as 'Ma' Barker
 Ralph Moody as Arthur 'Pa' Barker
 Coulter Irwin as FBI Agent Ross Baxter
 Jeanne Bates as Mrs. Ross Baxter
 Sydney Mason as Lieutenant Bill Baxter
 Bill Baldwin Sr as Special Agent Fenton/Narrator
 Captain Frank Hamer as Texas Ranger 
 Sam Flint as FBI Chief 
 Florence Lake as Bessie, the landlady
 Russ Whitney as Verne Miller
 Helen Van Tuyl as Texas Lady Governor
 Hank Patterson as Scully Wass (Farmer)
 Robert Bice as FBI Agent Tyler
 Percy Helton as pool room proprietor
 Scott Douglas as FBI Agent Clifton
 William Boyett as FBI Agent on pier
 Ray Boyle as Raymond Hamilton
 Texas Joe Foster as Tony Milento
 Joseph J. Greene as Arthur Troser
 Darlene Fields as Connie, Dillinger's girl
 Dick Foote as prison trusty
 Billy Griffith as Bucher
 Robert Vanselow as John Hamilton
 Glenn Holden as Dillinger's jail guard
 Harold 'Tommy' Hart as garage man
 Smoki Whitfield as the bootblack

See also
 List of American films of 1957

References

External links
IMDB
Jeanne Carmen images from the film

1957 films
Biographical films about Depression-era gangsters
Films about John Dillinger
Films about Bonnie and Clyde
Films about Ma Barker
Cultural depictions of Pretty Boy Floyd
Cultural depictions of Baby Face Nelson
American black-and-white films
1957 crime films
Films edited from television programs
Films scored by Paul Dunlap
Films directed by Richard C. Kahn
Films about the Federal Bureau of Investigation
1950s English-language films
1950s American films